Largu River may refer to:

 Largu, a tributary of the Bistra in Neamț County
 Largu, another name for the river Bolătău in Neamț County

See also 
 Larga River (disambiguation)
 Larga Mare River
 Larga Mică River
 Valea Largă River (disambiguation)